Mayapuri is an industrial locality in the West Delhi district of Delhi, India. It used to be a major hub of heavy metal and small scale industries, but following recent government sanctions, most of the heavy metal industries moved out. The place is now a combination of residential area, light metal factories, scrap markets, and automobile service stations. In 2010, a major radiation accident took place in the scrap yards of Mayapuri. 

There are some famous landmarks in the area like the Food Corporation of India, Metal Forging and Deen Dayal Upadhyay Hospital. The area is connected with Delhi Metro by Mayapuri station. Mayapuri is also one of the major bus terminals for the Delhi Transport Corporation (DTC).

2010 Mayapuri radiological accident

In the early April of 2010, Mayapuri was affected by a serious radiological accident. An AECL Gammacell 220 research irradiator owned by Delhi University since 1968, but unused since 1985, was negligently sold at an auction to a scrap metal dealer in Mayapuri on 26 February 2010. The orphan source arrived at the scrap yard in Mayapuri during March, where it was dismantled by workers unaware of the hazardous nature of the device. The cobalt-60 source was cut into eleven pieces. The smallest of the fragments was taken by Ajay Jain, one of the dealers, who kept it in his wallet; two fragments were moved to a nearby shop; and the remaining eight remained in the scrap yard. Eight people were hospitalized in All India Institute of Medical Sciences, New Delhi for radiation injuries, where one later died due to multi-organ failure. Police cordoned off the market and all ten 60Co sources were recovered by Atomic Energy Regulatory Board in mid-April and were transported to Narora Atomic Power Station, where it was claimed that all radioactive material originally contained within the device was accounted for. The material remains in the custody of the Department of Atomic Energy

The event was rated level 4 out of 7 on the International Nuclear Events Scale. After the incident, AERB organized many awareness drives for Mayapuri scrap dealers broadly on the safety, legal and regulatory aspects while handling and disposal of radioactive materials. A year later, Delhi Police charged six Delhi University chemistry professors for negligent disposal of the radioactive device.

Metal recycling industry

One of the main businesses in Mayapuri is the recycling of metal scraps and sale of salvage vehicle parts. It is, arguably, the biggest market for used automotive and industrial spare parts in India. Many traders from all over India come here to sell or purchase old auto parts. Many small workshops specialised in different metals are active in the Mayapuri area. The safety of the scrap yards became a concern after the radiological accident which occurred in April 2010. The area is not equipped with radiation detectors or portals, despite being standard equipment in scrap yards and recycling facilities in the US and most European countries. The presence of toxic heavy metals and harmful chemicals in the waste generated by these activities threaten the health of several thousands of people living in the area.

Major landmarks
Mayapuri is home to the following key landmarks:
 New Era Public School - popular school
 Metal Forging - one of the oldest forging units
 Food Corporation of India - government organization 
 India International Marketing Company
 Swarg Ashram Mandir - temple

Surrounding areas
 Rajouri Garden
Naraina Vihar
 Hari Nagar
 Tilak Nagar
 Delhi Cantt
 Kirti Nagar

See also
 1990 Clinic of Zaragoza radiotherapy accident
 Acerinox accident
 Goiânia accident
 Ionizing radiation
 List of civilian radiation accidents
 Nuclear safety
 Nuclear whistleblowers
 Orphan source
 Radiation accident in Mexico City
 Radioactive scrap metal
 Radiotherapy accident in Costa Rica
 X-ray

References

External links
 The Hindu: lessons from Mayapuri
 Article in Robert Johnston's database of radiological incidents

Cities and towns in West Delhi district
Neighbourhoods in Delhi
Radiation accidents and incidents